Yotvata Airfield is a small desert airfield in south Israel 40 km north of Eilat adjacent to Kibbutz Yotvata.
The runway is in a state of disrepair. It is unused except for agricultural flights and is listed as the contingency airport for nearby Eilat Airport and Ovda International Airport.

See also
 Yotvata
 List of airports in Israel

External links
 Yotvata Airfield
 Data for Yotvata airport 

Airports in Israel
Eilat
Buildings and structures in Southern District (Israel)